The Boardgame Players Association is a non-profit corporation established to support the shared interests of board game players.  The BPA is best known for hosting the World Boardgaming Championships.

In addition to its flagship event, the BPA also sponsors or co-sponsors the following annual events:
 Enlightentment – Held in Timonium, Maryland focusing on the Age of Renaissance game
 D-Day – Held in Timonium, Maryland focusing on the Breakout Normandy game
 Waterloo – Held in Timonium, Maryland focusing on the Napoleonic Wars game

The BPA also Play-By-eMail Tournaments for selected games, including:
 Breakout: Normandy
 Manifest Destiny
 Paths of Glory
 The Russian Campaign
 War at Sea
 Victory in the Pacific
 We the People
 For the People
 Empire of the Sun
 Wilderness War

The BPA formerly sponsored the following annual events:
 Euro Quest – Held in Timonium, Maryland focusing on a variety of European-style board games
 Winter Activation Meeting (WAM) – Held in Timonium, Maryland focusing on two-player historical card-driven games

External links
Boardgame Players Association

Board game websites